Gayathri Kariyawasam (born 25 December 1976) is a former Sri Lankan woman cricketer. She was a member of the Sri Lankan cricket team during the 2009 Women's Cricket World Cup.

References

External links 

1976 births
Living people
Sri Lankan women cricketers
Sri Lanka women One Day International cricketers
Colts Cricket Club cricketers
Cricketers from Colombo